David Sossenheimer (born 21 June 1996) is a German professional volleyball player. He is a member of the Germany national team. At the professional club level, he plays for Arago de Sète.

Honours

Clubs
 National championships
 2016/2017  German SuperCup, with VfB Friedrichshafen
 2016/2017  German Cup, with VfB Friedrichshafen
 2016/2017  German Championship, with VfB Friedrichshafen
 2017/2018  German SuperCup, with VfB Friedrichshafen
 2017/2018  German Cup, with VfB Friedrichshafen
 2017/2018  German Championship, with VfB Friedrichshafen
 2018/2019  German SuperCup, with VfB Friedrichshafen
 2018/2019  German Cup, with VfB Friedrichshafen
 2018/2019  German Championship, with VfB Friedrichshafen
 2020/2021  Italian SuperCup, with Sir Safety Perugia
 2020/2021  Italian Championship, with Sir Safety Perugia

Individual awards
 2017: German SuperCup – Best Opposite 
 2018: German SuperCup – Most Valuable Player

References

External links

 
 Player profile at LegaVolley.it 
 Player profile at PlusLiga.pl 
 Player profile at Volleybox.net 

1996 births
Living people
People from Erlenbach am Main
Sportspeople from Lower Franconia
German men's volleyball players
German expatriate sportspeople in Poland
Expatriate volleyball players in Poland
German expatriate sportspeople in Italy
Expatriate volleyball players in Italy
German expatriate sportspeople in France
Expatriate volleyball players in France
MKS Będzin players
Outside hitters